Kaatialaite (Fe(H2AsO4)3·5H2O) is a  ferric arsenate mineral found in Finland.

References

External links 
Mindat.org - Kaatialaite
Handbook of Mineralogy - Kaatialaite

Arsenate minerals
Iron(III) minerals
Monoclinic minerals
Minerals in space group 14